Anti Kuus (born 29 December 1956 in Saaremaa) is an Estonian economist, entrepreneur, photographer and singer-songwriter.

Biography
Kuus graduated from Tallinn Polytechnic Institute (now called Tallinn University of Technology), Estonian Business School, and York University (in Canada). He has a master's degree in International Business Administration.

He has worked as economist, finance director and CEO.  He has established companies Arco, Baltic Tours, AKTA, Aktaprint...
From 1989 to 1992, Kuus was a member of the City Council of Kuressaare. During Estonia's transition from socialism to capitalism, Kuus worked in the Saaremaa Development Centre  "Arco" and actively dealt with starting up entrepreneurship and foreign economic relations in Saaremaa.

Kuus started to take a serious interest in photography in 1991, and has since published seven books of his photographs.  He deals mostly with nature subjects, especially the natural environs of Saaremaa.  His photographs portray the sea and sky in different variations.  In 1999–2013, Kuus has published a calendars featuring his nature photographs.

Kuus has held photograph exhibitions in Estonia, the Czech Republic, and Austria.

From 1995 onward, Kuus has split his time between living and working in Tallinn and leisure time on his farm in Saaremaa.

In 2016, he focused in songwriting and released the debut CD album "Saaremaa Blues". His songs have performed also by Nunnu & Rockstar.

Bibliography 
Kuus' published works include:
  (reprint 2002)
 
 
 
 
 
  (with Sulev Oll).

Discography 
 Saaremaa Blues. AKTA 2019.

References

Estonian photographers
Estonian businesspeople
1956 births
Living people
Tallinn University of Technology alumni
People from Kuressaare
21st-century Estonian male singers